Ilya Valeryevich Konovalov (born 4 March 1971 in Yefrosimovka, Kursk) is a retired male hammer thrower from Russia, whose personal best throw is 82.28 metres, achieved in August 2003 in Tula.

In 2007 Konovalov was found guilty of acetazolamide doping. The sample was delivered on 17 December 2006 in an in-competition test in Kursk, Russia. He received a suspension from February 2007 to February 2009.

International competitions

Note: At the 2004 Athens Olympics, Konovalov failed to reach the final. He originally finished 14th in the qualifying round but was promoted to 12th after two of the finalists were disqualified for failing drug tests.

See also
List of doping cases in athletics

References 

 
 

1971 births
Living people
Sportspeople from Kursk Oblast
Russian male hammer throwers
Olympic male hammer throwers
Olympic athletes of Russia
Athletes (track and field) at the 1996 Summer Olympics
Athletes (track and field) at the 2000 Summer Olympics
Athletes (track and field) at the 2004 Summer Olympics
Universiade medalists in athletics (track and field)
Universiade bronze medalists for Russia
Medalists at the 1997 Summer Universiade
Goodwill Games medalists in athletics
Competitors at the 1998 Goodwill Games
World Athletics Championships athletes for Russia
World Athletics Championships medalists
Russian Athletics Championships winners
Russian sportspeople in doping cases
Doping cases in athletics